Glória do Ribatejo e Granho is a civil parish in the municipality of Salvaterra de Magos, Portugal. It was formed in 2013 by the merger of the former parishes Glória do Ribatejo and Granho. The population in 2011 was 4,107, in an area of 84.65 km².

References

Freguesias of Salvaterra de Magos